Mark Pepperday (born 15 March 1961) is a British figure skating coach and former competitor. He is the 1977 World Junior silver medalist. His highest placement at the European Championships was 14th, in 1981, and his highest placement at the World Championships was 20th, in 1983.

After retiring from competition, Pepperday toured with Holiday on Ice for three and a half years and became a skating coach. He has been based at Bülacher Eislaufclub in Bülach, Switzerland. He has coached Sarah Meier, Moris Pfeifhofer, and Myriam Leuenberger, among others.

Mark Pepperday and Anita Pepperday-Siegfried have founded Pepperday's Pro Ice Skating in 2019 and offer ice skating trainings in Bülach, Switzerland and Dübendorf, Switzerland.

Results

References

1961 births
British emigrants to Switzerland
British figure skating coaches
British male single skaters
Living people
People from Bülach
World Junior Figure Skating Championships medalists